Frank Cottrell-Boyce (born 23 September 1959) is an English screenwriter, novelist and occasional actor, known for his children's fiction and for his collaborations with film director Michael Winterbottom. He has achieved fame as the writer for the 2012 Summer Olympics opening ceremony and for sequels to Chitty Chitty Bang Bang: The Magical Car, a children's classic by Ian Fleming.

Cottrell-Boyce has won two major British awards for children's books, the 2004 Carnegie Medal for Millions, which originated as a film script, and the 2012 Guardian Prize for The Unforgotten Coat, which was commissioned by a charity.

Personal life
Cottrell-Boyce was born in 1959 in Bootle near Liverpool to a Catholic family. He moved to Rainhill, while still at primary school. He attended St Bartholomew's Primary School in Rainhill and West Park Grammar School. He was greatly influenced by reading Moomins growing up.

He read English at Keble College, Oxford, where he went on to earn a doctorate. He wrote criticism for the magazine Living Marxism. As a result, there was supposedly always a copy of the magazine on sale in the newsagent set of long-running British soap Coronation Street, while Cottrell-Boyce was on the writing staff of that programme.

He met Denise Cottrell, a fellow Keble undergraduate, and they married in Keble College chapel. Together they have seven children. He is also a patron of the Insight Film Festival, a biennial, interfaith festival held in Manchester, UK, to make positive contributions to understanding, respect and community cohesion.

Aidan Cottrell-Boyce, one of the couple's sons, is also a writer.

Career
He was a leading light in the Liverpool band "Dead Trout" in 1979.

After he met Michael Winterbottom, the two collaborated on Forget About Me. Winterbottom made five further films based on screenplays written by Cottrell-Boyce, Butterfly Kiss, Welcome to Sarajevo, The Claim, 24 Hour Party People and Code 46. Their 2005 collaboration, A Cock and Bull Story, is their last according to Cottrell-Boyce, who asked that his contribution be credited to "Martin Hardy", a pseudonym. He told Variety, "I just had to move on ... what better way to walk away than by giving Winterbottom a good script for free?"

Other film directors Cottrell-Boyce has worked with include Danny Boyle (Millions), Alex Cox (Revengers Tragedy), Richard Laxton (Grow Your Own) and Anand Tucker (Hilary and Jackie).

Cottrell-Boyce has been praised by Roger Ebert as one of the few truly inventive modern-day screenwriters. He has spoken against the "three-act structure" and the "hero's journey" formulas, which are often regarded as axiomatic truths in the business. perhaps his most famous example of this is in 24 Hour Party People where the character of Anthony Wilson states that “Scott Fitzgerald said there are no second acts in American lives. This is Manchester. We do things differently. This is the second act” which Cottrell-Boyce has stated was due to criticism of the script not following the three act structure. 

In addition to original scripts, Cottrell-Boyce has also adapted novels for the screen and written children's fiction. His first novel Millions was based on his own screenplay for the film of the same name; it was published by Macmillan in 2004. Cottrell-Boyce won the annual Carnegie Medal from the British librarians, recognising it as the year's best children's book published in the U.K. His next novel Framed, he made the shortlist for both the Carnegie and the Whitbread Children's Book Award. He adapted it as a screenplay for a 2009 BBC television film. He made the Carnegie shortlist again for Cosmic (2008). In 2011, he was commissioned to write a sequel to the Ian Fleming children's book Chitty Chitty Bang Bang, which was published in October 2011 as Chitty Chitty Bang Bang Flies Again. In addition to Coronation Street, he wrote many episodes of the soap opera Brookside, as well as its spin-off Damon and Debbie.

He wrote and staged his first original theatre production Proper Clever at the Liverpool Playhouse during the city's European Capital of Culture Year, in 2008. On 18 September 2010, he co-presented the Papal Visit at Hyde Park with TV personality Carol Vorderman. In June 2012, he assumed the position of Professor of Reading (the first such professorship) at Liverpool Hope University.

Cottrell-Boyce was the writer of the 2012 Summer Olympics opening ceremony, whose storyline he based on Shakespeare's The Tempest. He collaborated with director Danny Boyle and other members of the creative team, including designer Mark Tildesley, in the development of the story and themes, and wrote "short documents that told the story of each segment" to provide context for choreographers, builders and other participants. He also wrote the brochure, the stadium announcements and the media guide for presenter Huw Edwards.

Three months later, Cottrell-Boyce won the 2012 Guardian Children's Fiction Prize for The Unforgotten Coat. That story of a crosscultural friendship was inspired by a Mongolian girl he met as a writer visiting her school, whose family was subsequently deported by the British immigration office. It was commissioned by Reader Organisation of Liverpool and 50,000 copies were given away. The Guardian Prize is judged by a panel of British children's writers and recognises the year's best book by an author who has not yet won it. Interviewed by the sponsoring newspaper, Cottrell-Boyce told The Guardian that "I'm definitely a children's writer[;] that's what I want to be. I'm always trying to get rid of everything else. ... The movies I'm doing are ones that have been on the blocks for a long time."

Cottrell-Boyce was made an Honorary Doctor of Literature at Edge Hill University on 16 July 2013. In 2014, Cottrell-Boyce wrote an episode of Doctor Who, titled "In the Forest of the Night". He also wrote the second episode of the tenth series, "Smile". In September 2015, Cottrell-Boyce held the keynote speech at the Children´s and Young Adult Program of the 15th international literature festival berlin.

In January 2018, he was on the victorious Keble College, Oxford University Challenge "famous alumni" team; he got almost all of the points scored by Keble (total score 240) and was lionized on social media as a consequence; Reading University scored 0 in that game, thus making television history.

Novels
 Millions (2005)
Framed (2005)
 Cosmic (2008)
 Desirable (2008)
 The Unforgotten Coat (2011)
 Chitty Chitty Bang Bang Flies Again (2011)
 Chitty Chitty Bang Bang and the Race Against Time (2012)
 Chitty Chitty Bang Bang Over the Moon (2013)
 The Astounding Broccoli Boy (2015)
 Sputnik's Guide to Life on Earth (2016)
 Runaway Robot (2019)
 Noah's Gold (2021)

Appearances
 March 2010 – Desert Island Discs
 December 2017 - University Challenge

Writing credits

Television

Film

Awards and nominations

Awards
2004: Buch des Monats des Instituts für Jugendliteratur/Book of the Month by the Institute for Youth Literature (Germany), Millions
2004: Carnegie Medal, Millions
2004: Luchs des Jahres (Germany), Millions
2004: Eule des Monats (Germany), Millions
2005: Branford Boase Award, shortlist, Millions
2005: Carnegie Medal, shortlist, Framed
2006: Die besten 7 (Germany), Framed
2008: Guardian Prize, shortlist, Cosmic
2009: Carnegie Medal, shortlist, Cosmic
2011: Gelett Burgess Children's Book Award, Honors, Cosmic
2011: Costa Book Awards, shortlist, The Unforgotten Coat

References

External links

 Author's Blog —April/May 2007
 
 
 
 WriteAway interview with Frank Cottrell Boyce
 Official Chitty Chitty Bang Bang Flies Again website
 Mother Daughter Book Club.com, Interview with Frank Cottrell Boyce

1959 births
Living people
People from Rainhill
21st-century English novelists
Academics of Liverpool Hope University
Alumni of Keble College, Oxford
Carnegie Medal in Literature winners
English children's writers
English dramatists and playwrights
English male novelists
English Roman Catholics
English screenwriters
English male screenwriters
English soap opera writers
English television writers
Fellows of the Royal Society of Literature
Guardian Children's Fiction Prize winners
English male dramatists and playwrights
British male television writers